Lipovka is a rural locality (a village) in Fominskoye Rural Settlement, Gorokhovetsky District, Vladimir Oblast, Russia. The population was 2 as of 2010.

Geography 
Lipovka is located on the Oka River, 94 km south of Gorokhovets (the district's administrative centre) by road. Bykasovo is the nearest rural locality.

References 

Rural localities in Gorokhovetsky District